John Mulcahy (17 May 1932 – 7 September 2018) was an Irish journalist, magazine and newspaper editor, who founded The Sunday Tribune newspaper and The Phoenix.

Biography

Born in Australia in 1932, Mulcahy was educated at Clongowes Wood College and Trinity College, Dublin. He worked in the financial sector before becoming a full-time journalist. He was writing for monthly The Hibernia Magazine before 1968. When he became the owner and editor of Hibernia, he changed its ethos to be more left-wing and republican and moved it to a fortnightly schedule.

Following the closure of Hibernia in 1980 due to a lawsuit, he co-founded The Sunday Tribune. After the turmoil in the Tribune, from which he exited early, in 1983 he founded the political, current affairs and business magazine, The Phoenix. In 2002 he became the proprietor of The Irish Arts Review. Another effort at launching a magazine in the early 1980s was Digger, his father's nickname since he was involved in the mining industry in Australia.

He was married to Nuala, who worked alongside him at Hibernia and The Phoenix. His son Aengus worked for The Phoenix, his daughter Brigid is also a journalist, and his son Michael Mulcahy was a Councillor, TD and former Lord Mayor of Dublin.

He retired from The Phoenix in 2007 and died aged 86 in 2018.

References

Irish journalists
Irish newspaper editors
Irish magazine founders
Irish newspaper founders
Magazine publishers (people)
Sunday Tribune people
1932 births
2018 deaths
People educated at Clongowes Wood College
Alumni of Trinity College Dublin